Dániel Németh (born 1975) is a Hungarian photographer who won in the Travel/Culture category of the National Geographic International Photography Contest 2006. The winning photo shows a Muslim woman with a scarf holding a child in Barcelona, Spain Feria de Abril.  He was born in Budapest.

References

External links
Winning Photo
Official website

Living people
1975 births
Hungarian photographers